Carapinae is a subfamily of pearlfishes, of the family Carapidae. The subfamily consists of four genera:

Carapus Rafinesque, 1810
Echiodon Thompson, 1837
Encheliophis Müller, 1842
Onuxodon J.L.B. Smith, 1955

References

Carapidae